According to several historians, the U.S. state of Oregon contains over 200 ghost towns. Professor and historian Stephen Arndt has counted a total of 256 ghost towns in the state, some well known, others "really obscure." The high number of ghost towns and former communities in the state is largely due to its frontier history and the influx of pioneers who emerged in the area during the 19th century. Many of the ghost towns in Oregon were once mining or lumber camps that were abandoned after their respective industries became unprosperous.

This list includes towns and communities that have been described as ghost towns, and may be abandoned, unpopulated, or have populations that have declined to significantly small numbers; some may still be classified as unincorporated communities. , some of the towns included may have small residual populations; others may retain few physical remnants of their existence, but are broadly considered ghost towns under prevailing definitions in the United States.

Classifications
Many historians and enthusiasts of ghost towns use a classification system to distinguish ghost towns by types. This classification, which breaks towns into numerous different types, was established by photographer Gary Speck, and has been adapted here.

Towns

See also

 :Category:Former populated places in Oregon
 Lists of Oregon-related topics
 List of flooded towns in the United States#Oregon
 List of ghost towns in the United States

Notes and references

Notes

References

Sources

External links
Oregon at GhostTowns.com

Oregon
Ghost towns